The Governance of China is a four-volume collection of speeches and writings by Xi Jinping, the General Secretary of the Chinese Communist Party and current paramount leader of China. Presenting the official party line for China's development in the 21st century, the collection is an authoritative source on Xi Jinping Thought and a literary successor to Chairman Mao Zedong's  Quotations from Chairman Mao Tse-tung.

The volumes were published in 2014, 2017, 2020 and 2022 respectively.

Overview
Governance of China consists of 270 pieces, organized thematically into 54 chapters. All three volumes were edited by three entities: the State Council Information Office, the Central Policy Research Office of the Central Committee of the Chinese Communist Party, and the China International Publishing Group. The volumes are also interspersed with photography of Xi, depicting him "at work and in daily life".

The text articulates Xi Jinping Thought, Xi's political philosophy as it relates to large-scale political issues concerning China including economics, domestic politics, international relations, infrastructure, technology, environmentalism, peaceful co-existence, and the military. Volume I also contains a political biography of Xi in the appendix.

Release

The first two volumes of Governance of China were formally presented to western audiences at the London Book Fair upon their release, and both volumes have been translated into other major languages, including English, Arabic, French, German, Japanese, Spanish, Portuguese, Russian, Uyghur, Tibetan, Kazakh, Korean, Kyrgyz, Mongolian, Polish, Standard Zhuang, and so forth. The third volume was announced by Chinese state media on 30 June 2020.

Reception
Reviews of Governance of China have been mixed. It was positively received by Chinese media and officials and received measured praise from non-Chinese leaders. Prayuth Chan-ocha, the leader of Thailand's military junta, for instance, asked his cabinet to study the first volume shortly after it was released.

In Western media, it largely received negative reviews, with some regarding it as propaganda but offering that it is a useful guide to better understanding China under Xi Jinping's leadership. Bethany Allen-Ebrahimian, writing in Foreign Policy, for instance, called it a "mix of stilted Communist Party argot, pleasant-sounding generalizations, and 'Father Knows Best'-style advice to the world".

It received limited praise in other areas of Western society, however, with Facebook CEO Mark Zuckerberg reportedly having read the book and ordering copies for his company's employees (though Zuckerberg's interest in the book has been interpreted as a vested interest—Facebook is blocked in China, and if the block were lifted the potential result would be a dramatic increase in Facebook's userbase).

Although Chinese media have reported global circulation numbers for the book's volumes on the order of several million copies, Western media have reported very low sales numbers for the work in Western countries. A 2021 report published by Reuters, claimed that Amazon sided with the Publicity Department of the Chinese Communist Party and stopped allowing any customer reviews for the book on the Chinese version of the website, citing "two people familiar with the incident".

See also
 General Secretary Xi Jinping important speech series
 Quotations from Chairman Mao Zedong

Notes

References

External links

The Governance of China online in Chinese.
The Governance of China online in English.

2014 non-fiction books
2017 non-fiction books
Chinese culture
Chinese literature
Communist books
Ideology of the Chinese Communist Party
People's Republic of China culture
Propaganda books and pamphlets
Propaganda in China
Works by Xi Jinping